Roger Griffith is an American basketball executive..

Griffith initially worked for the Minnesota Lynx' sibling team, the Minnesota Timberwolves, as executive vice president and chief financial officer. Prior to that, he had worked for Timberwolves and Lynx owner Glen Taylor at Taymark.

Griffith succeeded the Lynx's first coach and general manager, Brian Agler, in 2003. While his hiring was relatively uneventful, he eventually received some criticism from fans, especially during a long playoff drought during the first part of his tenure as general manager. These calls stopped, however, after Griffith hired coach Cheryl Reeve, and built a team around Seimone Augustus, Lindsay Whalen, and Maya Moore. The team won six Western Conference championships and four WNBA championships between 2011 and 2017.

Griffith is married to the daughter of Lynx and Timberwolves owner Glen Taylor, and the two have two children.

References

Year of birth missing (living people)
Living people
People from Eagan, Minnesota
Minnesota Lynx executives
Augsburg University alumni
American chief financial officers
American chief executives of professional sports organizations